Dennis Fairclough is Deputy Chair/Professor at the Computing & Networking Sciences Department at Utah Valley University.   He specializes in teaching Borland C++ Builder and Java.  

Raised in Northern California, Fairclough earned a Ph.D. at Brigham Young University.  He taught at BYU's department of electric engineering from 1976 to 1984.  He was an architect of Wicat Systems and began the computer-related section at Eyring Research Institute.  He subsequently founded Praxis Computer Systems and Icon Systems.

References

External links
UVU page

Novell NetWare
Living people
Utah Valley University faculty
Novell people
Year of birth missing (living people)